Parliamentary elections were held in Greece on . The result was a landslide victory for Eleftherios Venizelos and his Liberal Party, which won 187 of the 316 seats in Parliament. Venizelos claimed that his victory was proof that the Greek people approved of his policy, favoring the Allies of World War I.

Results

Aftermath
Despite the Liberals' victory, the dispute between Venizelos and King King Constantine I continued. Fresh elections were held in December, which were boycotted by Venizelos and his party as unconstitutional. In August 1916, Venizelos went on to establish a rival Provisional Government of National Defence in the North of the country under the auspices of Entente powers, an event known as the National Schism.

The May 1915 Parliament was subsequently recalled when Constantine was forced to abdicate and leave the country in June 1917 following the Venizelists' victory. As a result, the Parliament was ironically nicknamed by royalists as the "Parliament of the Lazaruses" (Βουλή των Λαζάρων), and continued to sit until the October 1920 elections.

See also
Greece during World War I

References

1915 05
Greece
1915 in Greece
1910s in Greek politics
Eleftherios Venizelos
History of Greece (1909–1924)
Greece
Legl